Pulaski's Legion was a cavalry and infantry regiment raised on March 28, 1778 at Baltimore, Maryland under the command of Polish-born General Casimir Pulaski and Hungarian nobleman Michael Kovats de Fabriczy for their service with the Continental Army during the American Revolutionary War. The Legion consisted of one troop of lancers, two troops of dragoons, and 200 light infantry soldiers. It was one of the few cavalry regiments in the Continental Army.

Role in the American Revolution
The Legion would see action at the Little Egg Harbor massacre in 1778, siege of Savannah in 1779, and the siege of Charleston in 1780. The Legion was disbanded in November 1780 and the men were merged into Armand's Legion. The Legion's 1st Cavalry was commanded by Maj. Pierre-Francois Vernier during the siege of Charleston's first bloody skirmishes.

References

Robin Smith, Pulaski's Legion, Military Illustrated magazine, Issue 116
Richard Henry Spencer, Pulaski's Legion (including Legion's muster roll), Baltimore 1920

External links
The Continental Army (describes Pulaski's Legion)
The Pulaski Legion in the American Revolution, Review in The Sarmatian Review
The Pulaski Legion (reenactment and research)

Military units and formations established in 1778
Military units and formations of the Continental Army
Maryland in the American Revolution
Dragoons
1778 establishments in Maryland
Casimir Pulaski